Fredericton High School is a high school in the city of Fredericton in New Brunswick, Canada.

History

When the city of Fredericton was initially laid out in 1758, city planners set aside a plot of land in the downtown region that was intended to become a school. That school was incorporated in 1790 as the College of New Brunswick and was intended to be a boarding school, patterned after the boys' public schools in England. In 1829 when King's College opened in Fredericton, the school was renamed to the Collegiate Grammar School, and was supported by the College. In 1871, the Free School Act was enacted, and the school again changed its name, this time to the Collegiate High School. At this time it became a preparatory school for King's College, which by then had become the University of New Brunswick.

FHS copes with the Syrian exodus
In July 2016, Fredericton High School attracted media attention after The Rebel obtained internal documents discussing the transitional challenges of hosting new students fleeing the Syrian Civil War. Said administrator Chantal Lafargue,

Canadian Minister of Immigration John McCallum has said that while the refugee program is a federal responsibility, schools are a responsibility of the provinces.

Notable alumni

 Measha Brueggergosman, opera singer.
 Bliss Carman, Poet
 Justin Conn, Calgary Stampeders linebacker
 Matt DeCourcey, Member of the Parliament of Canada for Fredericton
 Paul Hodgson, Former MLB player (Toronto Blue Jays)
 Marianne Limpert,  Olympic silver medalist swimmer.
 Elizabeth Roberts MacDonald (1864-1922), Canadian writer, suffragist
 Dan McCullough, B.C. Lions long snapper
 Murray Douglas Morton, Member of Parliament and judge
 David Myles, vocalist
 Kim Parlee, host of Business News Network's MoneyTalk
 Sir Charles G.D. Roberts, Poet
 William Harris Lloyd Roberts (1884–1966), writer, poet, playwright
 Francis Sherman, Poet
 Anna Silk, Actress
 Matt Stairs,  Former Major League Baseball right fielder, Philadelphia Phillies, 2008 World Series Champion
 John Williamson, Member of the Parliament of Canada for New Brunswick Southwest

References

External links
Fredericton High School
The History of Fredericton High School
FHS Black Kats Football Team

High schools in Fredericton
Educational institutions established in 1800